Perfect Day is a 1929 short comedy film starring Laurel and Hardy.

Plot
Two families embark on a pleasant Sunday picnic in their Ford Model T, but manage to run into a variety of issues with the temperamental automobile. Each incident requires repeated exits and reboardings by Laurel, Hardy, their wives and grouchy, gout-ridden Uncle Edgar, and repetitions of the word ‘goodbye’. This segment may have been inspired by UK comedian Harry Tate and his famous 1907 ‘Motoring’ sketch, a vaudeville staple well-known on both sides of the Atlantic. A brick-throwing argument with a neighbor threatens to escalate into an all-out turf war until the local parson gets involved. The families manage to finally get their day underway, only to plunge neck-deep into a seemingly shallow, water-filled pothole.

Cast

Production notes
Perfect Day was written in May 1929 and filmed between June 1–8, 1929. The original 1929 release of Perfect Day contained no music other than that used over the opening credits. The Roach Studios would reissue the film in 1937 with an added music score being utilized at the time in other Roach comedies. The 1929 version was considered lost until the 2011 DVD release Laurel and Hardy: The Essential Collection, when the original Vitaphone disc track sans the incidental music became available.

Adding the soundtrack in 1937 to the existing film resulted in a slight reduction of the correct frame ratio: several scenes feature a slightly cropped picture at the top and left hand sides to allow for inclusion of the soundtrack strip.

The UCLA Film and Television Archive screened a newly restored version of the film at the 2019 UCLA Festival of Preservation. The archive "continues its mission to save the Hal Roach films of Laurel and Hardy," Head of Preservation Scott MacQueen wrote. "No body of classic comedy has been as badly abused as the Laurel and Hardy negatives, mercilessly pushed through laboratory meat grinders for decades to extract every showprint to garner every last nickel from a relentless audience. Restoring these films includes not only finding the pictorially and physically best surviving copies, but authentic content such as day-and-date title sequences lost when reissue distributors appended their own credit cards." For Perfect Day, "the original soundtrack (replaced in the mid-1930s with new music mixes) had to be recovered. Digital technology now permits us to achieve repairs once thought impossible" so that this film "looks and sounds as it did nearly 90 years ago."

The script for Perfect Day originally concluded with the family partaking in their picnic, but this was discarded when the extended gags centering on the troublesome Model T provided enough comic material to sustain the entire film.

Perfect Day was also filmed outdoors, which freed it from the stagebound claustrophobia common to many early talkies. The opening scene is the only one set indoors (the sound of whirring cameras can be heard in some shots), while the exterior sound recording was technically impressive during an era of filmmaking when most actors had to stand close to the overhead microphone. The live outdoor recording also revealed the improvisatory nature of most early Laurel and Hardy. A seated Edgar Kennedy manages to ad lib "Oh, shit!", which escaped the scrutiny of movie and television censors.

Despite the fact that the film industry was still adjusting to the making talking pictures, Laurel and Hardy mastered the new technology early on; the overall excellence and high reputation of Perfect Day bears testimony to the team's fruitful use of the new medium. Using sound effects to punctuate a visual gag — a technique The Three Stooges would build their entire film career around — was still in its infancy in 1929. The loud, ringing CLANG heard when Stan is beaned on the head with the Model T's clutch would be termed by a 1929 film reviewer as "the funniest effect so far heard in a comedy." The second half of the Stooges' 1948 film Pardon My Clutch and its remake, Wham Bam Slam, is a remake of Perfect Day.

1937 reissue soundtrack
"Ku-Ku" (Marvin Hatley)
"We're Just a Happy Family" (Leroy Shield)
"Let's Face It" (Shield)
"We're Out for Fun" (Shield)
"Carefree" (Shield)
"Up in Room 14" (Shield)
"The Laurel and Hardy Waltz" (Nathaniel Shilkret)
"Up in Room 14" (reprise) (Shield)
"Colonial Gayeties" (Shield)
"On a Sunny Afternoon" (Shield)
"We're Out for Fun" (Shield)
"Here Comes the Stagecoach" (Hatley)
"Our Relations/Finale" (Shield)

The Sons of the Desert
Chapters — called Tents — of The Sons of the Desert, the international Laurel and Hardy Appreciation Society, all take their names from L&H films. The Perfect Day Tent is in Amsterdam, The Netherlands.

References

External links 
 
 
 
 

1929 short films
1929 comedy films
American black-and-white films
1920s English-language films
Films directed by James Parrott
Laurel and Hardy (film series)
Metro-Goldwyn-Mayer short films
Films with screenplays by H. M. Walker
American comedy short films
1920s American films